Cereus hildmannianus is a species of cactus from southern South America. Its distribution is uncertain but probably includes Brazil, Paraguay, Uruguay and Argentina.

Description
The cylindrical, segmented, blue-green to cloudy green shoots are often blue-green in colour when young, becoming duller green with age. Stems are usually spineless (except in subspecies uruguayensis). They have a diameter of up to 15 centimeters. There are four to six sharp-edged ribs that are up to 3.5 centimeters high. The areoles on it are small. Thorns are usually not formed.

Flowering appears when the plant is around 4 to 5 years old and is abundant during summer nights. The spherical fruits are colored red to yellow. They contain a white pulp.

Cultivation
It is necessary to water abundantly during the period of growth, and very little during the period of rest. The species can tolerate some cold, even a few degrees below zero, if the soil is dry. Young plants need shade, while adults need full sun.

Distribution

Cereus hildmannianus is thought to be widespread in Brazil, Mato Grosso do Sul, Paraguay, Uruguay, Bolivia and Argentina. 

It is found in sandy, rocky soils, outcrops and on cliffs. It eventually occurs as an epiphyte over trees and shrubs. It blooms from October to February. The flower is nocturnal and closes in the morning. All parts of the plant are edible by the fauna. In Rio Grande do Sul, it is used as an ornamental and the fruits are appreciated by the population. It is commonly used by birds to build nests.

Systematics

Cereus hildmannianus was first named by Karl M. Schumann in 1890. Plants named as Cereus uruguayensis by Roberto Kiesling in 1982 were reduced to C. hildmannianus subsp. uruguayensis by Nigel P. Taylor in 1998, thereby creating the autonym C. hildmannianus subsp. hildmannianus. Subspecies hildmannianus has the same range as the species as a whole and is usually spineless, unlike subsp. uruguayensis which is only found in Uruguay.

References

hildmannianus
Cacti of South America
Plants described in 1890

es:Cereus hildmannianus